The Ixchayá River is a river in Guatemala flowing from the Guatemalan highlands into the Pacific Ocean. It passes through the department of Retalhuleu.

Rivers of Guatemala
Geography of the Retalhuleu Department